Hemilissopsis is a genus of beetles in the family Cerambycidae, containing the following species:

 Hemilissopsis clenchi Lane, 1959
 Hemilissopsis fernandezae Hovore & Chemsak, 2006

References

Elaphidiini